LAI – Línea Aérea IAACA (legally Industria Aero Agrícola C.A.) was an airline based in Barinas, Venezuela.

History
The airline was founded in 1992 as a cropdusting company. It later turned into an air taxi service. LAI became a regular airline in 1995.

The airline stopped operating on September 27, 2006, after financial problems. After the cessation, a group wanted to make an airline label to achieve and reach number one among passenger airlines, to connect the tourist destinations from and to Venezuela, with a modern fleet and high-tech equipment.

Destinations

LAI operated to the following destinations: 

Acarigua (Oswaldo Guevara Mujica Airport)
Barcelona (General José Antonio Anzoátegui International Airport)
Barinas (Barinas Airport) Hub
Caracas (Simón Bolívar International Airport)
Carúpano (General José Francisco Bermúdez Airport)
Ciudad Bolívar (Tomás de Heres Airport)
Cumaná (Antonio José de Sucre Airport)
Guanare (Guanare Airport)
Güiria (Güiria Airport)
Maturín (José Tadeo Monagas International Airport)
Mérida (Alberto Carnevalli Airport)
Porlamar (Santiago Mariño Caribbean International Airport)
Valera (Antonio Nicolas Briceño Airport)

Fleet
Linea Aerea IAACA included the following aircraft:
2 Beechcraft Model 18
2 ATR 42-300
1 ATR 42-320
3 ATR 72-200

See also
List of defunct airlines of Venezuela

References

External links

Defunct airlines of Venezuela
Airlines established in 1992
Airlines disestablished in 2006
2006 disestablishments in Venezuela
Venezuelan companies established in 1992